Ha Tae-Yeon (Hangul: 하태연, Hanja: 河泰連; born March 27, 1976, in Daegu) is a retired South Korean wrestler.

References
Ha Tae-Yeon's profile from sports-reference

External links
 

1976 births
Living people
South Korean wrestlers
Olympic wrestlers of South Korea
Wrestlers at the 1996 Summer Olympics
South Korean male sport wrestlers
World Wrestling Championships medalists
Sportspeople from Daegu
20th-century South Korean people
21st-century South Korean people